is the son of Japanese inventor of Taiwanese descent of Top Ramen, or Cup Noodles, Momofuku Ando. Following his father's death in 2007, Koki Ando is now the president and the CEO of Nissin Foods Holdings Co. Ltd.

References

1947 births
Living people
People from Ikeda, Osaka
Japanese people of Taiwanese descent
Japanese chief executives